Two ships of the United States Navy have been named Crossbill, after the crossbill, a finch whose curved mandibles cross each other.

 , acquired by the Navy on 31 October 1940.
 , laid down, 23 August 1941.

References 
 

United States Navy ship names